This is a detailed list of human spaceflights from 1981 to 1990, spanning the end of the Soviet Union's Salyut space station program, the beginning of Mir, and the start of the US Space Shuttle program.

Red indicates fatalities.
Green indicates suborbital flights (including flights that failed to attain intended orbit).

See also

List of human spaceflight programs
List of human spaceflights
List of human spaceflights, 1961–1970
List of human spaceflights, 1971–1980
List of human spaceflights, 1991–2000
List of human spaceflights, 2001–2010
List of human spaceflights, 2011–2020
List of human spaceflights, 2021–present

References
Vostok and Voskhod flight history
Mercury flight history
X-15 flight history (altitudes given in feet)
Gemini flight history
Apollo flight history (student resource)
Skylab flight history
Apollo-Soyuz flight history
Space Shuttle flight history infographic
Shenzhou flight history timeline
SpaceShipOne flight history

1981
1980
Spaceflight timelines
1980s-related lists